Böhm's flycatcher (Muscicapa boehmi) is a species of bird in the family Muscicapidae. Its natural habitat is subtropical or tropical dry forests (namely the miombo woodlands). It is named after German zoologist Richard Böhm.

References

Böhm's flycatcher
Birds of Sub-Saharan Africa
Böhm's flycatcher
Taxonomy articles created by Polbot
Taxobox binomials not recognized by IUCN